Robert Mutter (December 20, 1873 – November 7, 1948) was an American farmer, businessman, and politician.

Born in the town of Dover, Racine County, Wisconsin, Mutter was a farmer and owned a hotel and saloon. Mutter served as sheriff of Racine County and on the Racine County Board. In 1919, Mutter served in the Wisconsin State Assembly. He was a Republican. Mutter died in San Benito, Texas.

Notes

1873 births
1948 deaths
People from Dover, Racine County, Wisconsin
Businesspeople from Wisconsin
Farmers from Wisconsin
County supervisors in Wisconsin
Wisconsin sheriffs
Republican Party members of the Wisconsin State Assembly